Tail Lights Fade is a 1999 Canadian film directed by Malcolm Ingram and starring Denise Richards, Jake Busey, Breckin Meyer, Elizabeth Berkley, Jason Mewes, and Lisa Marie. The film follows two couples and their race across Canada to bail one of their brothers out of a marijuana charge by clearing out the grow house completely. The film's namesake gets its title from a 1992 Buffalo Tom song, which is also on the soundtrack.

Cast

Production troubles
In an interview for website IGN, writer/director Malcolm Ingram described the experience as being very unpleasant to handle. "But it wasn't in the cards. The Producer was insane, The Production company was lame, I was too green to deal with such insanity as the schedule being cut down by 12 days two weeks before we went to camera. On that film our Producer actually made offers to two separate actresses (Lisa Marie and Elizabeth Berkeley) at the same time. They both accepted and my poor screenwriter had to tear chunks of the script out and create a role to accommodate both actors. They were both great, and I wasn't complaining to have two incredible ladies in my film... but that is an example of the level of professionalism I was dealing with. I also remember we had a bare bones crew doing pick up shots for free to try and make up for the days we lost. God bless 'em. We were shooting a highly illegal scene involving fake cop cars and high speeds. No one really wanted to be there, But... It had to be done. The Producer (the one who f***ed us for days and left us in this highly precarious situation) didn't even stick around to show support, saying, "I'll say a prayer for you guys" as she bolted away from the travesty she was responsible for. The real shame is that I think that the actors really gave the goods... and the crew worked their hearts out. In the end... it wasn't what I had envisioned. However I'm still proud of the actors... and forever grateful to the crew... Wish I could have given 'em something to be a little prouder."

References

https://www.ign.com/articles/2002/03/01/10-questions-malcolm-ingram

External links

1999 films
1999 comedy films
Films directed by Malcolm Ingram
Canadian auto racing films
Canadian comedy films
English-language Canadian films
Trimark Pictures films
1990s English-language films
1990s Canadian films